Chandramukhi is a 2005 film.

Chandramukhi may also refer to

 Chandramukhi (character)
 Chandramukhi (TV series)
 Chandramukhi (1960 film)
 Chandramukhi (2022 film)

See also 
 Chandra Mukhi, a 1993 Indian film